Harry Munro (sometimes referred to as Munroe) was a Scottish footballer who played for Sheffield United and Gainsborough Trinity as a defender . Born in Scotland Munro had been playing for Somerton Athletic when he was recruited by Sheffield United in December 1890. His appearances were mainly limited to the large number of friendlies that the club still played at that time but he did also represent the club in the FA Cup and the Midland Counties League

Munro was released after just over a year at United and moved to Gainsborough Trinity where he enjoyed much more success, captaining the side and making 89 appearances in the English Football League for the Lincolnshire club.

References

Association football defenders
Scottish footballers
Sheffield United F.C. players
Gainsborough Trinity F.C. players
South Shields F.C. (1974) players
Year of birth missing
Year of death missing
Place of birth missing
19th-century Scottish people
Midland Football League players